Manchester Square is a locality in the Southern Highlands of New South Wales, Australia, in Wingecarribee Shire.

At the 2021 census, there were 27 residents.

References

Towns of the Southern Highlands (New South Wales)
Wingecarribee Shire